Wutuan is a rural town in Chengbu Miao Autonomous County, Hunan, China. The town shares a border with Pingdeng Town to the west, Dingping Township to the east, Baimaoping Township to the north, and Weijiang Township to the south. It is a major border trade town, because its north and west sides are Guangxi Zhuang Autonomous Region.

Name
"Wutuan" means five trionychidaes. The name of "Wutuan" derives from five sandbars in the river, which are similar to "trionychidaes", the pronunciation of "trionychidae" in local dialect is "Tuanyu".

History
During the Ming dynasty (1368–1644), it belonged to Moyidong. In the following Qing dynasty (1644–1911), it came under the jurisdiction of Xiamoyidong. In the Republic of China (1912-1949), it was a part of Xianyi Township. In 1934, the First Front Army of the Chinese Workers' and Peasants' Red Army passed here during the Long March.

After the establishment of the Communist State in 1950, its land belongs to the three townships of Jinshui, Jinnan and Wutuan. In 1958, the three townships were merged and renamed "Xianyi People's Commune". In 1961 it was split into two communes, namely Jinnan People's Commune and Wutuan People's Commune. In 1984, the two were renamed Jiangtousi Township and Wutuan Township respectively. In 1995, the Jiangtousi Township was merged into Wutuan Township. In the next year, it was upgraded to a town. On December 31, 2015, the former Nanshan Town was demerged, some areas were merged into Wutuan Town.

Administrative division
As of 2015, the town is divided into 15 villages: Dushu, Jindong, Shikong, Baishuitou, Lali, Mugua, Xuntou, Pingshan, Jiangtousi, Mudong, Tengping, Chushui, Chayuan, Hengzhou, Pulushui, and 2 communities: the 1st Community and 2nd Community.

Geography
The town is located in the southwest of Chengbu Miao Autonomous County.

The Furong River flows through the town south to north.

Demographics 
The National Bureau of Statistics of the People's Republic of China estimates the town's population was 13,476 on December 31, 2015. Miao people is the dominant ethnic group in the town, accounting for 68.57% of the total population. There are also nine ethnic groups, including Dong people, Yao people, Zhuang people and Tujia people. Among them, Han is 1,700, accounting for 13.39%, Dong, Yao, Zhuang and Tujia are 2,400, accounting for 18.90%.

Economy
The town's economy is based on nearby mineral resources and agricultural resources. Underground mineral resources include diabase, tungsten, silicon and lead. Agricultural products include rice, pepper, tomato, pear, tea, cattle, goat, medicinal materials, etc. Among them, pear, tea seed oil, pepper, tofu and fish are famous local products in the town.

Transportation
The County Road X093 passes across the town.

References

Chengbu Miao Autonomous County